The Campaign for Social Democracy was a minor political party which ran candidates in the February 1974 United Kingdom general election.

History
The party was formed in September 1973 by Dick Taverne, who had resigned from the Labour Party, after falling out with his Constituency Labour Party over the European Economic Community.

Taverne had formed the Democratic Labour Association in Lincoln and had been elected as an MP for Lincoln under that banner in a by-election in March, 1973. He formed the Campaign for Social Democracy as an attempt to build a radical non-doctrinaire social democratic movement, and at the February 1974 general election they stood four candidates against leading Labour left-wingers, including Tony Benn.

All candidates were unsuccessful, with the highest polling at 2.4% of the vote in their constituency. The campaign ended when the Labour Party won the October 1974 United Kingdom general election, making a split in the Labour Party less likely. Such a split did occur in the early-1980s, when leading moderate in the Labour Party formed the Social Democratic Party.

Election results
The party's results were:

References

Defunct political parties in the United Kingdom
Political parties established in 1973
Political parties disestablished in 1974